Fighter catapult ships (FCS) also known as Catapult Armed Ships were an attempt by the Royal Navy to provide air cover at sea. Five ships were acquired and commissioned as Naval vessels early in the Second World War, and these were used to accompany convoys. 
The concept was extended to merchant ships which were also equipped with rocket assisted launch systems and known as Catapult Aircraft Merchantmen (CAM ships). Both classes could launch a disposable fighter (usually a Hawker Hurricane) to fight off  a threat, with the pilot expected to be rescued after either ditching the aircraft or bailing out close to the launching ship.

The ships
There were five fighter catapult ships, collectively known as the Pegasus class. Two, Patia and Springbank, were lost during the war. They were each equipped with a single Fairey Fulmar or "Hurricat" (an adapted Hawker Hurricane Mk.1A).

See also 
 List of ships of the Second World War
 List of aircraft carriers of the Second World War
 Merchant aircraft carrier
 Aircraft cruiser
 CAM ship

References

Citations

Sources 
 

Ship types
Merchant aircraft carriers
North Atlantic convoys of World War II